The Viper Aircraft Viperfan was an American homebuilt aircraft that was designed and produced by Viper Aircraft of Kennewick, Washington, introduced in the late 1990s. The aircraft was intended to be supplied as a kit for amateur construction, but only one was ever built.

Design and development
The  Viperfan was designed to resemble a military jet trainer, but powered by a pusher piston engine. It featured a cantilever low-wing, a two-seats-in-tandem enclosed cockpit under a bubble canopy, retractable tricycle landing gear and a single engine in pusher configuration.

The aircraft was made from composite materials.

The aircraft was fully aerobatic and stressed to +/-6g.

The manufacturer estimated the construction time from the planned kit to be 2000 hours.

The aircraft was not a success due to problems with vibrations in the engine-to-propeller extension shaft and so the aircraft was converted to turbojet power. Eventually it was completely redesigned to become the Viper Aircraft ViperJet MKII.

Operational history
By 1998 the company reported that one aircraft had been completed and was flying.

In May 2015 no examples were registered in the United States with the Federal Aviation Administration and it is unlikely any exist anymore.

Specifications (Viperfan)

See also
List of aerobatic aircraft

References

External links

Viperfan
1990s United States sport aircraft
Single-engined pusher aircraft
Low-wing aircraft
Aerobatic aircraft
Homebuilt aircraft